Gamaches is a commune in the Somme department in Hauts-de-France in northern France.

Geography

History
 1471 Louis XI and the Burgundians wage war in and around the town. A year or so later, Charles the Bold ravaged Picardy in the continuing battle with Burgundy. The plague decimated not only the troops but also the local populace.
 Glass bottles have been manufactured in Gamaches since 1922.

Population

Places of interest
 The war memorial
 The thirteenth century church of Saint-Pierre and Saint-Paul, with its flamboyant gothic tower, is the result of successive architectural influences.
 The old railway line, opened in 1872 and closed in 1993  '''
 
 The lakes

See also
Communes of the Somme department

References

External links

 Agence Régionale du Patrimoine de Picardie 

Communes of Somme (department)